This is a list of episodes for Charlie Jade, a science fiction television program filmed mainly in Cape Town, South Africa. It stars Jeffrey Pierce in the title role, as a detective from a parallel universe who finds himself trapped in our universe. This is a Canadian and South African co-production filmed in conjunction with CHUM Television and the South African Industrial Development Corporation (IDC). The special effects were produced by the Montreal-based company Cinegroupe led by Michel Lemire.

The show started production in 2004 and was first aired on the Canadian Space Channel. It premiered on the Space Channel April 16, 2005 and was also shown in Eastern Europe, France, Italy, on SABC 3 in South Africa, on Fox Japan (since November 30, 2006), and on AXN in Hong Kong. The show began airing in The United Kingdom in October 2007, on FX. The Sci Fi Channel in the United States premiered the show on June 6, 2008, but after 2 episodes on Friday prime-time, moved it to overnight Mon/Tue.

Scripts for the second season of Charlie Jade were written; however, the show was not greenlit for a second season.

Episode list

Season 1 (2005)

Specials

References

External links 
 

Charlie Jade
Charlie Jade
Charlie Jade